United Gipuzkoa (GU) was a Basque Country-based party alliance led by the People's Alliance ahead of the 1977 general election.

Member parties
People's Alliance (AP)
Spanish Falange of the JONS (FE–JONS)

Defunct political party alliances in Spain
Political parties in the Basque Country (autonomous community)
Political parties established in 1977
Political parties disestablished in 1977